Managed Network Systems Inc. (doing business as MNSi Telecom) is a Canadian Internet service provider (ISP) and phone provider located in Windsor, Ontario. Opened in 1995, it is the oldest ISP in the Windsor-London area, having started in September of that year as a provider of Dial-up Internet access.

The company serves customers in the city, providing home and business phone, long distance, DSL Internet and fibre. MNSi also serves nearby areas of Southern Ontario, including Chatham, Leamington, LaSalle, Tecumseh, and Sarnia.

Acquisitions 

In 2017, MNSi became a sister company with Central Ontario communications company Nexicom. In November, 2016, Nexicom received The Outstanding Business Achievement Award by The Kawartha Chamber of Commerce and Tourism.

Introduction to fibre 

In 2012 the company started planning and digging for fibre delivery to Windsor  with a gradual roll-out of upgrades through to 2020. It will be an expected investment of more than $35 million. The service is available in Walkerville, Oldcastle and East Windsor.

The company is using its own fibre lines and the bandwidth is not purchased from a larger company. MNSi uses a local call centre.

References

External links
MNSi Website
Nexicom Website

Internet service providers of Canada
Internet technology companies of Canada
Companies based in Windsor, Ontario
Canadian companies established in 1995
Telecommunications companies established in 1995
1995 establishments in Ontario
Telecommunications companies of Canada
Privately held companies of Canada